Gerald Charles Levinson (born June 22, 1951 in Westport, Connecticut) is an American composer of contemporary classical music.

Life
At university, he studied with George Crumb, Richard Wernick, and George Rochberg.  After college, Levinson went to study composition with Olivier Messiaen at the Paris Conservatory.  He was inspired by Messiaen's use of birdsong and his unique harmonic ideas, as well as the musics of Bali and India.  Levinson has also worked with Simon Rattle, Ralph Shapey, and Seiji Ozawa.

His notable works include Anahata, Symphony No. 2, and Black Magic/White Magic (1981), a collaboration with his wife, poet Nanine Valen. Numerous CDs of his music have been released, and his scores are published by Theodore Presser.

He has taught music at Swarthmore College since 1977.  His works have previously been performed by orchestras such as the Philadelphia Orchestra and the Los Angeles Philharmonic. A new work for organ and orchestra by Levinson was premiered by the Philadelphia Orchestra in its 2005–2006 season.  He has two children, Adam Valen Levinson, and Ari Valen Levinson.

Awards
Guggenheim Fellowship (1982)
Music Award of the American Academy of Arts and Letters (1990)
The Goddard Lieberson Fellowship of the American Academy of Arts and Letters
N.E.A. Fellowship, twice
2007 Pew Fellowships in the Arts

External links
Gerald Levinson Official Website
Gerald Levinson page at Theodore Presser Company
Art of the States: Gerald Levinson
Gerald Levinson page from Swarthmore College site

1951 births
Living people
Swarthmore College faculty
20th-century classical composers
21st-century classical composers
American male classical composers
American classical composers
Pew Fellows in the Arts
People from Westport, Connecticut
Musicians from Connecticut
21st-century American composers
20th-century American composers
20th-century American male musicians
21st-century American male musicians